Pieksämäki is a town and municipality of Finland. Neighbour municipalities are Hankasalmi, Joroinen, Juva, Kangasniemi, Leppävirta, Mikkeli, Rautalampi and Suonenjoki.

Formation
Pieksämäki was formed as a town on 1 January 2007 with the consolidation of the Pieksämäki and Pieksänmaa municipalities.

Transport
Pieksämäki railway station is an important junction for the Finnish railway network, and Savo Railway Museum is located in the area.

Education
Diaconia University of Applied Sciences has a campus in Pieksämäki.

Politics
Results of the 2015 Finnish parliamentary election in Pieksämäki:

Centre Party   33.8%
Social Democratic Party   23.0%
True Finns   14.7%
National Coalition Party   10.3%
Green League   6.7%
Christian Democrats   4.8%
Left Alliance   4.7%

International relations

Twin towns — sister cities
Pieksämäki is twinned with:

  Faaborg-Midtfyn, Denmark  
  Falkenberg, Sweden  
  Gyöngyös, Hungary
  Porsgrunn, Norway 
  Shuya, Russia

Notable people
 Rietrik Polén (1823–1884), journalist and Finnish nationalist
 Edvard August Vainio (1853–1929,) lichenologist
 Sylvi Kekkonen (1900–1974), writer and First Lady of Finland
 Ville Leskinen (1995–), ice hockey player for Jukurit
 Ari-Pekka Liukkonen (1989–), olympic swimmer
 Esapekka Lappi (1991–), rally driver

See also
 Jäppilä

References

External links

 Town of Pieksämäki – Official website
 Visit Pieksämäki – Official tourism website

 
Populated places established in 1962
1962 establishments in Finland
Cities and towns in Finland